Thimmapur-M-Tadakod is a village in Dharwad district of Karnataka, India.

Demographics 
As of the 2011 Census of India there were 142 households in Thimmapur-M-Tadakod and a total population of 670 consisting of 352 males and 318 females. There were 85 children ages 0-6.

References

Villages in Dharwad district